West Michigan Lutheran High School is a Lutheran high school in Wyoming, Michigan, United States.

It was started in the fall of 2004 with 10 students who were freshmen and sophomores. Its first location was in the Ministry Center Building of St. Mark Lutheran Church of Kentwood, Michigan.  In the spring of 2007, WMLHS held its first graduation.

Demographics
The demographic breakdown of the 24 students enrolled in 2015-2016 was:
Asian/Pacific islanders - 12.5%
Black - 8.3%
White - 70.8%
Multiracial - 8.3%

Athletics

The WMLHS Mustangs are not affiliated with an athletic conference.  The school colors are navy blue and white.  Boys and girls basketball and track teams, along with a girls volleyball team are offered.

References

External links

2004 establishments in Michigan
Educational institutions established in 2004
Lutheran schools in Michigan
Private high schools in Michigan
Schools in Kent County, Michigan